The 2020–21 Saudi Professional League was the 45th edition of the Saudi Professional League, the top Saudi professional league for association football clubs, since its establishment in 1976. The season began on 17 October 2020 as a consequence of the postponement of the previous season's conclusion due to the COVID-19 pandemic. Fixtures for the 2020–21 season were announced on 29 September 2020.

Al-Hilal are the defending champions after winning the Pro League for the 16th time last season. Al-Ain, Al-Batin, and Al-Qadsiah join as the three promoted clubs from the 2019–20 MS League. They replace Al-Adalah, Al-Fayha, and Al-Hazem who were relegated to the 2020–21 MS League.

On 29 March, the Ministry of Sports announced that fans will be allowed to return to stadiums for the final three rounds of matches with a maximum of 40% capacity.  

On 23 May, Al-Hilal secured their seventeenth league title with one match to spare following a 1–0 away win against Al-Taawoun. It was also the club's second consecutive title and fourth in the last five seasons. Al-Ain were the first team to be relegated following a 2–0 defeat away to Al-Nassr on 14 May. In the final matchday, both Al-Qadsiah and Al-Wehda were relegated following a draw with Abha and a loss against Al-Shabab respectively.

Teams

Sixteen teams will compete in the league – the top thirteen teams from the previous season and the three teams promoted from the MS League.

Teams who were promoted to the Pro League

The first club to be promoted was Al-Batin, who were promoted following Al-Bukayriyah's 1–1 draw with Al-Ain on 1 September 2020. Al-Batin will play in the top flight of Saudi football after a season's absence. Al-Batin were crowned champions following their 1–1 draw with Al-Bukayriyah on the final matchday.

The second club to be promoted was Al-Ain, who were promoted on 10 September 2020 following their 2–0 win at home against Ohod. Al-Ain will play in the top flight of Saudi football for the first time in history. Al-Ain became the first team from the Al Bahah Region to play in the Pro League.

The third and final club to be promoted was Al-Qadsiah, following their 3–1 home win against an already promoted Al-Batin side on 10 September 2020. Al-Qadsiah will play in the top flight of Saudi football after a season's absence.

Teams who were relegated to the MS League

The first club to be relegated was Al-Adalah, who were relegated after only a year in the top flight following a 1–1 home draw with Al-Raed.

On 4 September 2020, Al-Hazem became the second club to be relegated following a 1–0 defeat away to Al-Shabab. Al-Hazem were relegated after two years in the top flight.

On 9 September 2020, Al-Fayha became the third and final club to be relegated following a 1–0 defeat away to Al-Taawoun in the final matchday. Al-Fayha were relegated after three years in the Pro League. This was Al-Fayha's first relegation from the top flight of Saudi football.

Stadiums
Note: Table lists in alphabetical order.

1:  Al-Faisaly play their home games in Al Majma'ah. 
2:  Al-Hilal and Al-Shabab also use Prince Faisal bin Fahd Stadium (22,500 seats) as a home stadium.

Personnel and kits 

 1 On the back of the strip.
 2 On the right sleeve of the strip.
 3 On the shorts.

Managerial changes

Foreign players
The policy of foreign players remained unchanged. Clubs can register a total of seven foreign players over the course of the season.

Players name in bold indicates the player is registered during the mid-season transfer window.

League table

Positions by round
The following table lists the positions of teams after each week of matches. In order to preserve the chronological evolution, any postponed matches are not included to the round at which they were originally scheduled but added to the full round they were played immediately afterward. If a club from the Saudi Professional League wins the King Cup, they will qualify for the AFC Champions League, unless they have already qualified for it through their league position. In this case, an additional AFC Champions League group stage berth will be given to the 3rd placed team, and the AFC Champions League play-off round spot will be given to 4th.

Results

Season statistics

Scoring

Top scorers

Hat-tricks 

Notes
(H) – Home; (A) – Away4 Player scored 4 goals

Most assists

Clean sheets

Discipline

Player 

 Most yellow cards: 12
 Anselmo (Al-Wehda)

 Most red cards: 2
 Mohamed Fouzair (Al-Raed)

Club 

 Most yellow cards: 78
 Al-Taawoun

 Most red cards: 7
 Al-Qadsiah

Awards

Monthly awards

Number of teams by region

References

1
Saudi Professional League seasons
Saudi Professional League
Saudi Professional League, 2020-21